Luisa Accati Levi (born in 1942) is an Italian historian, anthropologist and feminist public intellectual. She taught ethnology and modern history at the University of Trieste.

She was born in Turin. After finishing her studies at the University of Turin and in Paris, she turned to the research of the historical anthropology of rural societies in Northern Italy. She has published monographs on the rural religiosity and on witch trials in the region of Friuli, and on family relations in urban and semi-urban communities in 19th century Udine. Her major contributions are in the study of the cult of Mary and its symbolical meaning for understanding the different social and political structures in Catholic and Protestant societies in Europe.

Major works 
The Beauty and the Monster. Discursive and Figurative Representations of the Parental Couple from Giotto to Tiepolo. European Press Academic Publishing, 2006.
Madri Pervasive e Figli Dominanti ("Pervasive Mothers and Dominant Sons"). European Press Academic Publishing, 2003.

References 

1942 births
Living people
20th-century Italian historians
Italian women historians
Social historians
Italian anthropologists
Italian women anthropologists
Writers from Turin
Academic staff of the University of Trieste
University of Turin alumni
University of Paris alumni
Italian expatriates in France
21st-century Italian historians